Mark Webster (born 21 February 1990 in Penrith, New South Wales) is an Australian figure skater. He is the 2011 Australian national champion. He has represented Australia six times at the Four Continents Championships and three times at the World Championships. In 2010–11 he won his first senior national title by more than twenty points.

Programs

Competitive highlights 
CS: Challenger Series

References

 2009–10 Australian Championships 
 2007–08 Australian Championships 
 2006–07 Australian Championships 
 2005–06 Australian Championships, Junior and Senior

External links 
 

Australian male single skaters
1990 births
Living people
Sportsmen from New South Wales
Competitors at the 2013 Winter Universiade